HMS Dictator was a 64-gun third-rate ship of the line of the Royal Navy, launched on 6 January 1783 at Limehouse. She was converted into a troopship in 1798, and broken up in 1817.

French Revolutionary Wars

At the "Reduction of Trinidad" in 1797 Dictator participated in the later stages, not having arrived until 18 February, the prize money awarded reflecting this late arrival.

On 8 March 1801, whilst disembarking the army at the Battle of Aboukir during the French campaign in Egypt, one seaman was killed and a midshipman, Edward Robinson, fatally wounded.
Prize money for the capture of enemy ships was usually shared with other warships in the squadron between 1801 and 1806.

Because Dictator served in the navy's Egyptian campaign between 8 March 1801 and 2 September, her officers and crew qualified for the clasp "Egypt" to the Naval General Service Medal that the Admiralty issued in 1847 to all surviving claimants.

Napoleonic Wars

In the late summer of 1807, Dictator was part of Admiral Gambier's fleet in the Øresund at the Battle of Copenhagen where she shared prize money with some 126 other British naval ships.  She was again in Danish Waters the following year, in Admiral Hood's squadron of four ships-of-the-line together with some smaller vessels, tasked with maintaining the blockade between Jutland and Zealand.  Her captain, Donald Campbell, ordered the sloop  to proceed on her successful patrols to Samsø, Tunø and Endelave.
In August 1809 Dictator was tasked with the occupation of the Pea Islands to the east of Bornholm but ran aground en route and had to be towed back to Karlskrona for repairs.

The gunboats (Husaren, Løberen, and Flink) sought refuge in Grenå, on eastern Jutland, where a company of soldiers and their field guns could provide cover. However, the British mounted a cutting out expedition of some 200 men in ten ships’ boats after midnight on 7 July, capturing the three gunboats.

In 1812 Dictator led a small squadron consisting of three brigs, the 18-gun  Calypso, 14-gun brig-sloop Podargus and the 14-gun gun brig Flamer. On 7 July they encountered the Danish-Norwegian vessels Najaden, a frigate finished in 1811 in part with parts salvaged from a ship-of-the-line destroyed in earlier battles, and three brigs, Kiel, Lolland and Samsøe. Najaden was under the command of Danish naval officer Hans Peter Holm (1772–1812) In the subsequent Battle of Lyngør Dictator destroyed Najaden and the British took Laaland and Kiel as prizes but had to abandon them after the two vessels grounded. The action cost Dictator five killed and 24 wounded. In 1847 the surviving British participants were authorized to apply for the clasp "Off Mardoe 6 July 1812" to the Naval General Service Medal.

War of 1812
Under the rules of prize-money, the troopship Dictator shared in the proceeds of the capture of the American vessels in the Battle of Lake Borgne on 14 December 1814. HMS Dictator was one of several troopships among Admiral Alexander Cochrane's fleet moored off New Orleans at the start of 1815.

Notes, citations, and references
Notes

Citations

References

 Lavery, Brian (2003) The Ship of the Line – Volume 1: The development of the battlefleet 1650-1850. Conway Maritime Press. .
 T. A. Topsøe-Jensen og Emil Marquard (1935) "Officerer i den dansk-norske Søetat 1660–1814 og den danske Søetat 1814–1932" (in Danish).
 Voelcker, Tim (2008) Admiral Saumarez versus Napoleon : The Baltic 1807–1812 Boydell Press. .

External links
 

Ships of the line of the Royal Navy
Inflexible-class ships of the line
1783 ships
War of 1812 ships of the United Kingdom